Karl Johan Pettersen Vadøy (14 April 1878 - 21 October 1965) was a Norwegian politician for the Liberal Party.

He served as a deputy representative to the Norwegian Parliament from Sogn og Fjordane during the terms 1934–1936, 1937–1945 and 1945–1949.

References

1878 births
1965 deaths
Liberal Party (Norway) politicians
Deputy members of the Storting